The 1958 season was the 28th completed season of Finnish Football League Championship, known as the Mestaruussarja.

Overview
The Mestaruussarja was administered by the Finnish Football Association and the competition's 1958 season was contested by 10 teams. 

After the series had been completed, KuPS Kuopio and HPS Helsinki were tied with each having 26 points. These two teams then faced each other in a match that decided the championship. KuPS won the match and the championship 1–0 after extra time and earned a place in the 1959–60 European Cup preliminary round (although they subsequently withdrew).

VPS Vaasa and KTP Kotka, were relegated to the Suomensarja on the basis of the final table, while the third team to be relegated was decided in a replay between Haka Valkeakoski and IKissat Tampere Haka won 4–1 and remained in the Mestaruussarja, while IKissat was relegated.

League standings

Results

Footnotes

References
Finland - List of final tables (RSSSF)

Mestaruussarja seasons
Fin
Fin
1